The May-Stringer House, home of the Hernando Heritage Museum, is a historic residential building in Brooksville, Florida, United States. It is located at 601 Museum Court. On March 8, 1997, it was added to the National Register of Historic Places.

Overlooking the City of Brooksville, the house is a 4-story, seven gable, gingerbread trim, 14 room “Painted Lady” Victorian era home. The Hernando Historical Museum Association has created exhibit rooms with a Victorian Look, and there are rooms devoted to specific themes such as an Elegant Dining Room, Victorian Bedrooms, Military Room, an 1880s Doctor's Office, and a 1900s Communication Room. The museum contains over 10,000 artifacts that can be viewed.

History 
In 1842, The Armed Occupation Act ratified by the U.S. Congress, stated: “any settler who came to Florida, lived on the land for five years, cultivated five acres, and built a dwelling would be granted 160 acres”. Richard Wiggins homesteaded the land where the May Stringer house is located.

In 1855, John L. May purchased the property and built a 4-room home for his family. John lived in the simple four-room house with his wife, Marena, and their daughters, Matilda and Annie.  Unfortunately, John died of tuberculosis three years later.

Marena remained in the home throughout the Civil War and eventually married Confederate hero Frank Saxon. She died giving birth to the couple's child, a girl named Jessie Mae, in 1869. Jessie survived her birth but died of unknown causes three years later. Marena and Jessie were buried on the property, as were John May and the infant son of Frank and Marena, a detail which fuels many rumors about the May-Stringer haunting. It is known as one of the most haunted houses in Florida.

Frank Saxon sold the home, and the property eventually made its way to Dr. Sheldon Stringer. The doctor added ten rooms to the house giving it the Victorian appearance it has today. The estate also served the doctor's  medical practice for many years.

After the death of the Stringers, the house passed from one owner to another until Dr. Earl Hensley and his wife Helen sold it to The Hernando Historical Museum Association in 1980.

The May-Stringer Heritage Museum is one of three museums operated by the Hernando Historical Museum Association.  In addition to the May-Stringer House, the 1885 Brooksville Train Depot Museum and One Room Schoolhouse Museum are run by the Association.

References

External links
Hernando Historical Museum Association (official website)

Houses in Brooksville, Florida
Houses on the National Register of Historic Places in Florida
Museums in Hernando County, Florida
History museums in Florida
Military and war museums in Florida
American Civil War museums in Florida
National Register of Historic Places in Hernando County, Florida
1855 establishments in Florida
Houses completed in 1855
Queen Anne architecture in Florida
Vietnam War museums